Boothroyd is a village located west of Dewsbury in the Metropolitan Borough of Kirklees, West Yorkshire, England.

Boothroyd has a primary school. Grade II listed buildings in Boothroyd include the church of St John, the war memorial in Crow Nest Park, and the gate piers and gates to Crow Nest Park.

See also
Listed buildings in Dewsbury

References

Villages in West Yorkshire